Pomaderris subcapitata is a species of flowering plant in the family Rhamnaceae and is endemic to south-eastern continental Australia. It is a shrub with hairy stems, elliptic to egg-shaped leaves and dense clusters of cream-coloured or yellow flowers.

Description
The upper surface of the leaves is velvet-hairy with impressed veins, the lower surface with hairs like those on the stems. The floral cup and sepals are covered with whitish simple and grey star-shaped hairs. Flowering occurs from September to November and the fruit is a hairy capsule.

Taxonomy
Pomaderris subcapitata was first formally described in 1951 by Norman Arthur Wakefield in The Victorian Naturalist from specimens collected in 1900.

Distribution and habitat
This pomaderris grows in forest woodland and heath, usually in rocky places, in scattered places in New South Wales and the Australian Capital Territory, mainly south of Yerranderie, and in eastern Victoria.

References

Flora of New South Wales
Flora of Victoria (Australia)
Flora of the Australian Capital Territory
subcapitata
Plants described in 1951
Taxa named by Norman Arthur Wakefield